Young Gunz is an American hip hop duo from Philadelphia, Pennsylvania, composed of rappers Young Chris (born Chris Ries in 1983) and Neef Buck (born Hanif Muhammad in 1983). The group is part of Beanie Sigel's State Property collective and was signed to Roc-A-Fella Records. Young Gunz' debut single, "Can't Stop, Won't Stop", made the top 15 on the Billboard charts in 2003.

History

State Property
Ries and Muhammad had been friends since they were youths on the block(C-Ave). On "Takeover", a track from his 2001 album The Blueprint, Jay-Z announced the duo as "Chris & Neef".

In 2002, the duo performed on the State Property soundtrack album. Chris and Neef starred in the titular movie. Also during this period of their career, Young Chris appeared throughout Dame Dash's Dream Team compilation, and Beanie Sigel's The Reason. The duo performed together on guest appearances for albums like Jay-Z's The Blueprint 2, Freeway's Philadelphia Freeway, State Property's The Chain Gang Vol. 2, and Memphis Bleek's M.A.D.E.; all while recording their album.

The Young Gunz scored their first hit with "Can't Stop, Won't Stop", the lead-off single from the Chain Gang, Vol. 2 album. Its song and video received major airplay on hip-hop radio, MTV2, and BET and reached #14 on the U.S. Billboard 200 chart and #6 on the Billboard Hot Rap Tracks chart.

As a group
After the success of their single, "Can't Stop, Won't Stop", the label jumped and was ready to release their debut album, Tough Luv. It included the remix to "Can't Stop, Won't Stop", which featured St. Louis rapper Chingy. Singles included "No Better Love" featuring former Roc-A-Fella Records crooner Rell and the Just Blaze-produced "Friday Night". Tough Luv debuted on the Billboard 200 at #3 after selling 128,000 copies in its first week. That week, the album at #2 was labelmate Kanye West's debut album The College Dropout, which was released just two weeks earlier.

After a brief hiatus, the duo returned with Swizz Beatz produced "Set It Off" from their second album, Brothers from Another. This albums, which was released May, 24th 2005, sales were somewhat of a disappointment compared to the first, despite the decent exposure of the lead single, promotion from Jay-Z himself, TV, radio & magazine appearances. It was the second release from the "new" Roc-A-Fella Records, referencing when Jay-Z became president of Def Jam Records, the first being Memphis Bleek's 534. The album debuted on the Billboard 200 at #15, and included guest features from Kanye West, Swizz Beatz, Slim of 112 (Marvin Scandrick III) and John Legend.

Disputes with other rap artists
The Young Gunz were part of a public beef and a war of words with West Coast rapper, The Game. The feud stems from The Game's beef with Memphis Bleek, which escalated into a beef with the entire Roc-A-Fella camp with the exception of Kanye West, Jay-Z and Just Blaze. The Game dissed Bleek and The Young Gunz on his 15-minute freestyle track "300 Bars and Runnin'". The Young Gunz, along with Pooda Brown, responded with a freestyle of their own. Surprisingly, Chris & Neef started a beef with actor, comedian and rapper, Katt Williams. This beef stemmed from "Set It Off" by the Young Gunz, in which they called a character from a movie that Katt Williams played as, a "fake ass pimp." This beef was encouraged by The Game as he and Katt dissed the two on a Freestyle over their own "Set It Off" beat.

Young Chris solo work
As early as March 2006, Young Chris thought about recording a solo album. He initially titled it Now or Never. He stated to XXL magazine that he wanted to release a solo album by the end of 2008 and had been "95 percent done" by June 2008. In this article, Chris also states that he feels himself up there with Lil Wayne and Juelz Santana. Since this time, Chris has taken to the internet to solidify himself as a top solo artist, with his YoungChris.com Social Network, hitting the remix circuit, and his much anticipated "The Network" Mixtape series, hosted by DJ Don Cannon. Later in 2010 signed with Division 1, a label started by Rico Love, under the Universal/Motown umbrella. Rico considers Young Chris his flagship artist, working closely with Chris on his debut album and pre-album/mixtape. The mixtape, called "The Re-Introduction", was released on November 20, 2010. The aptly titled mixtape gives the spotlight to a newly signed Young Chris, as a solo artist, and also, re-introduces the combination of DJ Drama and Don Cannon, the former "Affiliates" partners, hosting their first mixtape together, in several years.

On January 28, a song called "Philly Shit (Mega Mix)" featuring Eve, Black Thought, Money Malc, Fat Joe, Fred The Godson, Diggy Simmons, Jermaine Dupri & Game was leaked.

Discography

Solo albums
 Tough Luv (2004)
 Brothers from Another (2005)

Collaboration albums
 State Property (with State Property) (2002)
 The Chain Gang Vol. 2 (with State Property) (2003)

Filmography
 State Property (2002)
 Fade to Black (2004)
 State Property 2 (2005)

References

External links

MTV.com Young Gunz profile

 
African-American musical groups
American musical duos
Hip hop duos
Hip hop groups from Philadelphia
Musical groups established in 1995
Roc-A-Fella Records artists
State Property (group) members
Gangsta rap groups
1999 establishments in Pennsylvania